In numerical linear algebra, the conjugate gradient method is an iterative method for numerically solving the linear system

where  is symmetric positive-definite. The conjugate gradient method can be derived from several different perspectives, including specialization of the conjugate direction method for optimization, and variation of the Arnoldi/Lanczos iteration for eigenvalue problems.

The intent of this article is to document the important steps in these derivations.

Derivation from the conjugate direction method

The conjugate gradient method can be seen as a special case of the conjugate direction method applied to minimization of the quadratic function

The conjugate direction method
In the conjugate direction method for minimizing

one starts with an initial guess  and the corresponding residual , and computes the iterate and residual by the formulae

where  are a series of mutually conjugate directions, i.e.,

for any .

The conjugate direction method is imprecise in the sense that no formulae are given for selection of the directions . Specific choices lead to various methods including the conjugate gradient method and Gaussian elimination.

Derivation from the Arnoldi/Lanczos iteration

The conjugate gradient method can also be seen as a variant of the Arnoldi/Lanczos iteration applied to solving linear systems.

The general Arnoldi method
In the Arnoldi iteration, one starts with a vector  and gradually builds an orthonormal basis  of the Krylov subspace

by defining  where

Put in matrix form, the iteration is captured by the equation

where

with

After each step of iteration, one computes  and the new iterate .

The direct Lanczos method
For the rest of discussion, we assume that  is symmetric positive-definite. It then can be more clearly denoted by

Hence,  can be LU factorized without partial pivoting into

Rewrite  as

with

It is now important to observe that

With this formulation, we arrive at a simple recurrence for :

The relations above straightforwardly lead to the direct Lanczos method, which turns out to be slightly more complex.

The conjugate gradient method from imposing orthogonality and conjugacy
If we allow  to scale and compensate for the scaling in the constant factor, we potentially can have simpler recurrences of the form:

is symmetric and lower triangular simultaneously and thus must be diagonal.

As a result,

As a result,

This completes the derivation.

References

Numerical linear algebra
Optimization algorithms and methods
Gradient methods
Articles containing proofs